The victims of the White Ship disaster on 25 November 1120 (called 7 kalends of December by Farrer) have been unevenly identified by various sources. The impact of the disaster on the throne of England is well-documented, and this article presents the details of what is known (and/or believed) about the crew and passengers of the ill-fated voyage as well as those who chose not to travel on her.

Captain and crew 
 Thomas FitzStephen, Captain
 Helmsman (unnamed), apparently drunk 
 Approximately 50 oarsmen and sailors (named)

Passengers who died 

Approximately 250, including servants and marines. Of these, 140 were knights or noblemen and 18 were noblewomen.

Family of Henry I, King of England 
 William Adelin, Duke of Normandy, son and heir to the English throne of his father Henry I, youngest son of William the Conqueror. William, rescued in the only skiff available on the ship, had the crew return to get his sister Matilda. The small craft was overwhelmed by drowning passengers and crew and quickly sank. Upon hearing of his son's death, it was said that Henry never smiled again.
 Matilda (Mathilde) FitzRoy, Countess of Perche, wife of Rotrou III, Count of Perche, William's illegitimate half-sister by Henry's mistress known only as Edith. The Anglo-Saxon Chronicles do not list Matilda as being aboard the ship. 
 Richard of Lincoln, William's illegitimate half-brother. Richard's betrothed Amice, daughter of the vanquished defender of Brémule, did not travel with him.

Family of Hugh d'Avranches, Earl of Chester 
 Richard d'Avranches, 2nd Earl of Chester, son of Hugh d'Avranches, Earl of Chester.
Lucia-Mahaut (Matilda), Countess of Chester, the king's niece and wife of Richard d'Avranches. She was the daughter of Stephen, Count of Blois and so sister to Stephen, King of England, who chose not to board the vessel. Lucia-Mahaut's mother was Adela of Normandy, daughter of William the Conqueror.
 Ottuel d'Avranches, the illegitimate son of Hugh d'Avranches (and so half-brother of Richard d'Avranches), governor of the king's sons.
 Geoffrey Ridel, Royal Justice, husband of Geva, daughter of Hugh d'Avranches (and so brother-in-law to Richard d'Avranches).

Seigneurs de l'Aigle, also related to Hugh d'Avranches 
 Gilbert d'Aigle, Vicomte of Exmes, father of Geoffroy and Engenulf, and married to Juliette, the second daughter of Geoffrey II, Count of Perche, and therefore sister of Rotrou III the Great. His mother was Judith d'Avranches, sister of Hugh d'Avranches. 
 Geoffroy de l'Aigle (survived clinging to a rock, but then succumbed to exhaustion). Geoffroy was son of Gilbert d'Aigle and Juliette du Perche (sister-in-law to the king's daughter Matilda) who was the daughter of Geoffrey II, Count of Perche. [Geoffroy’s sister Margaret was the Queen consort of Navarre as the first wife to Garcia Ramirez “the Restorer” of Navarre.]
 Engenulf d'Aigle, brother of Geoffroy de l'Aigle.

Household of the King 
 William Bigod, steward of the household of King Henry.
 Gisulf, the king's "iniquitous secretary". 
 Robert I of Mauduit, chamberlain to the king, son of William I of Mauduit. Robert's brother William II was the great-great-grandfather of William Maudit, 8th Earl of Warwick.
 Stewards, chamberlains, cupbearers and various officers.
 An armed marine force, who were apparently very disorderly, drunk and scarcely paid attention to anyone on board.

Nobles of England 
A number of other nobility of England were on board, although very little is known about them.
 Walter of Everci.
 Richard Anskill, son and heir of a Berkshire landowner. Illegitimate son of Henry I and 3rd mistress, Ansfride or Ansfrida 
 Richard de Bostock, Bostock Hall, Cheshire (b1075 d 1120)
 Robert Mauduit, nobleman.
 Hugh of Molines.

Nobles of Normandy 
 Ralph the Red (Ralph le Roux) of Pont-Echanfray, who saved Richard from capture at Les Andelys. Ralph's second wife may have also been on the ship. Some sources identify him as an illegitimate son of Robert de Lacy, which seems unlikely.
 Ivo II and William de Grandmesnil, described as the "two beautiful sons" of Ivo de Grandmesnil.
 William of Rhuddlan, son of Robert of Rhuddlan and cousin of Ivo II and William de Grandmesnil.

Clergy 
 Geoffrey, Archdeacon of Hereford.
 William, son of Roger, Bishop of Coutances, with his brother and three nephews.

Family of the Emperor 
 Dietrich (Theodoric), son of Heinrich (d. 1105), a relative of Henry V, Holy Roman Emperor. Heinrich was likely the son of Agnes of Germany, sister of the emperor. Orderic Vitalis identified him as Teodericus puer Henrici nepos imperatoris Alemannorum, which would imply that he was the grandson of Agnes. Farrer identifies him as a nephew of Emperor Henry (by his sister Agnes and Frederic, Duke of Swabia), but Dietrich's status as grand-nephew seems more likely.

The sole survivor 
 Berold, a butcher from Rouen, who was likely on board to collect the debts owed to him by the travelers.

Those who chose to travel on a different ship 
 Henry I, King of England.
 Matilda, wife of William Adelin and daughter-in-law of Henry I. She was the daughter of Fulk V, Count of Anjou, and Ermengarde, Countess of Maine, and did not travel on the White Ship, inexplicably going on a different ship.
 Two monks of Tiron (names unknown).
 Stephen of Blois, later King of England, with two men-at-arms.
 William de Roumare, Earl of Lincoln.
 Edward of Salisbury, High Sheriff of Wiltshire and chamberlain to the king.
 Rabel, son of the chamberlain Robert I of Mauduit (see above).
 Ranulf le Meschin, 3rd Earl of Chester, a nephew of Richard, 2nd Earl of Chester.
 William de Pirou, steward to the king (Orderic Vitalis claims he died aboard the ship, which seems unlikely since he was apparently still alive in 1123).

Commentary 
As is true of all such tales, the stories about the White Ship abound with inconsistencies. Whether these amount to a conspiracy as some have claimed (e.g., Chandler, Follett The Pillars of the Earth), there will likely never be resolution. Even by 12th-century standards, an act of mass murder of such a scale to gain political power stretches the imagination.

Nevertheless, among the inconsistencies is, first and foremost, why an experienced captain such as FitzStephen would allow his crew to get drunk, especially when ferrying such an august group of nobles. While the Royal Navy was below par following the Norman conquest, it defies imagination that a captain would allow such behavior. Nor was the ship filled with immature persons, as there were many senior nobles and experienced Crusaders aboard.

The king chose not to travel in the White Ship (although, as the king, he could certainly travel however he liked), but then neither did William Adelin's wife. Perhaps the best answer was that she was merely 14 years old at the time, and so must have been under the care of a custodian. It is also suspect that William, rescued in the only available skiff, would hear his half-sister's cries among the chaos and have the boat turn around. 

William's half-brother Richard was betrothed to Amice, daughter of Raoul II de Gael, and yet she was not traveling to England with her fiancé; however, most nobility married for political reasons, and there can be no assumption of affection between the two. Given the victory of Henry over the French, it would be assumed that perhaps the resultant marriage would take place in London.

Although there is speculation that the king's agents must have known about the drunkenness and overcrowding of the ship and that many of the nobles (including the future king of England) chose not to board. However, contemporary accounts state that the White Ship, which had a reputation of speed, left long after the others, and that its crew and captain expected to be able to catch the ship carrying the king. Perhaps King Henry would have conducted a full investigation of the incident, given that three of his children, including his only legitimate male heir, died. But such investigations are a modern practice, not necessarily a medieval one. No results of any such investigations seem to have been recorded.

References

Bibliography 

 
Shipwrecks in the English Channel
1120 in England
12th-century maritime incidents